Greg Davis (born April 25, 1951) is a former American college football coach. He served as offensive coordinator and quarterbacks coach for the University of Iowa Hawkeyes football team until announcing his retirement 
on January 6, 2017
. He served as offensive coordinator for the 2005 national champion Texas Longhorns, where he was awarded the Broyles Award for the nation's top assistant coach for the 2005 season.

Playing career
Davis attended Port Neches–Groves High School and then played quarterback at McNeese State University, where he first met R. C. Slocum. He played in the Grantland Rice Bowl in 1971, losing to Tennessee State 26–23. He graduated from McNeese State in 1973.

Coaching career
Davis started his coaching career as a quarterbacks/receivers coach at Barbe High School in Lake Charles, Louisiana. He served two seasons there, and then went on to become the quarterbacks coach for two seasons at Port Neches-Groves High School, his high school alma mater. He began his college coaching career as the quarterbacks coach under Tom Wilson and Jackie Sherrill at Texas A&M University. He was a part-time assistant at A&M in 1978, and then was named a full-time coach in 1979. He worked alongside Slocum, who then served as the defensive coordinator.

Davis later became an assistant under Mack Brown at Tulane University, and succeeded Brown as Tulane head coach in 1988. Following stints at the University of Georgia and the University of Arkansas, Davis rejoined Brown's coaching staff at North Carolina, before following him to Texas in 1998.

For the 2008 season, Davis's salary was raised to $425,000, making him the second highest-paid offensive coordinator in the nation, behind Florida State's Jimbo Fisher.

However, on December 6, 2010, after the worst season in the Mack Brown era at the University of Texas, Greg Davis resigned as offensive coordinator of the Longhorns.  The 2010 season was the first season in 13 years the Longhorns failed to make a bowl game, and the first in nine seasons the Longhorns failed to reach 10 wins on the season.

After a year out of football, Davis was hired by the University of Iowa for the 2012 season. Greg Davis replaced Ken O'Keefe as the offensive coordinator for the Iowa Hawkeyes in 2012.

Head coaching record

References

Sources

External links
 Iowa profile

1951 births
Living people
American football quarterbacks
Arkansas Razorbacks football coaches
Georgia Bulldogs football coaches
Iowa Hawkeyes football coaches
McNeese Cowboys football players
North Carolina Tar Heels football coaches
Texas A&M Aggies football coaches
Texas Longhorns football coaches
Tulane Green Wave football coaches
High school football coaches in Louisiana
High school football coaches in Texas
People from Port Neches, Texas
Players of American football from Texas
Educators from Texas